Stomopteryx sphenodoxa is a moth of the family Gelechiidae. It was described by Edward Meyrick in 1931. It is found in India.

The larvae feed on Crotalaria species. They mine the leaves of their host plant.

References

Moths described in 1931
Stomopteryx